Jean Albert Sulpice (born 1913) is a French former curler.

Sulpice competed for France at three , two times as skip. At the national level, he competed from Club de curling Mont d'Arbois (Megève), five-time French men's champion.

Curling teams

References

External links

1913 births
French male curlers